Valeria Stenkina is a Russian operatic soprano and Meritorious Artist of Russia.

Biography
Stenkina was born in Samara, Russia. In 1992 she graduated from the Saint Petersburg Conservatory and four years later, for the first time, has appeared at the Mariinsky Theatre in the title role of Salome. She became a permanent member of the Mariinsky company and since 1997 has performed such roles as Tatyana in Eugene Onegin, Maria in Mazeppa, as well as  Violetta in La traviata and Kundry in Parsifal.

In 1998 performed with the Estonian National Opera where she sang the role of Elizabeth in Don Carlos and the same year performed the title role in Norma with the Lithuanian National Opera. In 1999 she reprised the title role in Tosca in the great hall of the Saint Petersburg Philharmonia and at International Chaliapin Festival in Kazan. In November of the same year she  performed in Otello and Il trovatore conducted by Zurab Sotkilava at the Opera House, Riga and in December she performed Richard Strauss's Four Last Songs with the Jerusalem Symphony Orchestra conducted by Uriel Segal.

She has also recorded two CDs, one in 1992 published by Sony Music Entertainment and another in 1994 published by Melodiya.

References

Living people
20th-century births
20th-century Russian women opera singers
Russian sopranos
Saint Petersburg Conservatory alumni
Honored Artists of the Russian Federation
Singers from Saint Petersburg
Year of birth missing (living people)
21st-century Russian women opera singers